The 1987–88 Rugby League Premiership was the 14th end of season Rugby League Premiership competition.

The winners were Widnes.

First round

Semi-finals

Final

References

1988 in English rugby league